"Shot Caller" is a song by American hip hop recording artist French Montana, released on January 10, 2012, as his commercial debut single. The hip hop song features on the chorus and was produced by American music producer Harry Fraud. The song was first released as part of Montana's mixtape Mister 16: Casino Life on February 15, 2011.

Background 
After French Montana announced signing with P. Diddy's Bad Boy Records in December 2011, a promotional video for the song "Shot Caller" was posted on WorldStarHipHop on December 11, 2012. A commercially available single for the song was made available on January 12, 2012, with Charlie Rock credited for the chorus feature this time around.

Remix 
On November 23, 2011, a remix for the song was made available featuring P. Diddy, Rick Ross and Charlie Rock. After announcing in January 2012 that Montana had signed a joint co-signing deal between Diddy's Bad Boy Records and Ross' Maybach Music Group, a promotional video and single was made available for "Shot Caller (Remix)" on February 21, 2012.

Music videos 
Filming for the "Shot Caller" music video took place on August 18, 2011. The video showcased model Yaris Sanchez, alongside guest appearances by P. Diddy, Fat Joe, Waka Flocka, Busta Rhymes, Trae Tha Truth, Chinx Drugz, and producer Harry Fraud. The promotional video was posted on WorldStarHipHop on December 8, 2011.

Filming for the "Shot Caller (Remix)" video took place on January 29, 2012, and showcased guest appearances by Wale, DJ Khaled, Meek Mill, Ace Hood, and child rapper Lil Poopie. The promotional video and single was made available on February 21, 2012.

Track listing 
Digital Single

Chart performance

References 

2012 debut singles
French Montana songs
2011 songs
Songs written by French Montana
Bad Boy Records singles
Interscope Records singles